Katla may refer to:
Katla (volcano), in Iceland
Katla people, in Sudan
Katla languages, a language family of Sudan
Katla language, a language of Sudan
Katla basketball team, a basketball club in Iceland
Katla (dragon), a fictional character from the Swedish children's book The Brothers Lionheart by Astrid Lindgren
Katla (album), by Ida Maria
Katla (TV series), a 2021 Icelandic drama television series

People with the name
 Katla (musician),  Finnish singer
Katla M. Þorgeirsdóttir (born 1970), Icelandic actress, voice actress and writer

See also
Katla Geopark, in Iceland

Language and nationality disambiguation pages